Margareta Forsgårdh (born 20 March 1951) is a Swedish former professional tennis player. Her name before marriage was Margareta Strandberg.

Forsgårdh, a three-time national champion in singles, represented Sweden in the Federation Cup during the 1970s. She featured in five ties for her country and won three singles rubbers.

Her best grand slam performance was a second round appearance at the 1975 French Open.

See also
List of Sweden Fed Cup team representatives

References

External links
 
 

1951 births
Living people
Swedish female tennis players
20th-century Swedish women